Lowell S. Hawley (20 September 1908 - 6 May 2003) was an American writer.

Biography
Hawley was born in Lynden, Washington. He began his career writing for a radio station in Bellingham, Washington.

He moved to Los Angeles in 1942 and spent a decade writing for radio KFI and its program "Art Baker's Notebook." His first novel, "A Few Buttons Missing: The Case Book of a Psychiatrist" (1951) was a best seller. He followed it with  "Counsel for the Damned"  (1953) written with Ralph Bushnell Potts.

He was a writer for the Walt Disney Studio from 1957 to 1969. He then retired.

Credits

Books
A Few Buttons Missing (1951)

TV Series
The Loretta Young Show (1955–56) (TV series)
My Friend Flicka (1956) (TV series)
The Adventures of Jim Bowie (1957) (TV series)
The Millionaire (1957) (TV series)
Zorro (1958–59)  (TV series) - also story editor
The Sign of Zorro (1958)
The Californians (1959) (TV series)
Zorro, the Avenger (1959)

Features
Swiss Family Robinson (1960)
Babes in Toyland (1961)
In Search of the Castaways (1962)
Mooncussers (1962)
A Tiger Walks (1964)
The Adventures of Bullwhip Griffin (1967)
The Young Loner (1968)
The One and Only, Genuine, Original Family Band (1968)

References

External links

1908 births
2003 deaths
20th-century American screenwriters